Rum is a market town (since 1987) located in the Austrian state of Tyrol on the eastern border of Innsbruck in the administrative district of Innsbruck-Land. 

Since World War II, because of proximity to Innsbruck and development of an industrial area in Neu-Rum (New Rum), which abuts the Olympic Village district of the city, its population has greatly increased and it has become one of the richest municipalities in the state. The Hoch-Rum (Upper Rum) neighbourhood above the old centre of the town was an earlier development and includes a private clinic.

Today Rum is functionally part of Innsbruck, sharing its municipal services and transportation network, but efforts to incorporate it into the city have so far been unsuccessful.

Population

References

Cities and towns in Innsbruck-Land District